Forum Sport is a Dutch football club from Voorburg. Its main squad plays since 2013 in the Eerste Klasse. Homeground is Sportpark 't Loo and its colors are blue.

History
Forum Sport was founded on 1 July 1998 from a merger between DEVJO and SV Voorburg. DEVJO was founded on 15 July 1933, was originally a Christian football club and played on Saturdays. SV Voorburg played on Sundays. Forum Sport stopped Sunday football in 2005.

Associated people

Chief coaches

Notable players

DEVJO 
 Kees Jansma
 Peter Jungschläger
 Herman Kuiphof

SV Voorburg 
 Eljero Elia
 Matthew Steenvoorden

Forum Sport 
 Eljero Elia
 Matthew Steenvoorden
 John Verhoek

References 

Football clubs in South Holland
Football clubs in the Netherlands
1998 establishments in the Netherlands
Association football clubs established in 1998
Sport in Leidschendam-Voorburg